White Plains may refer to:

Places in the United States 
 White Plains, Calhoun County, Alabama, a census-designated place
 White Plains, Chambers County, Alabama, an unincorporated community
 White Plains, Georgia
 White Plains, Kentucky
 White Plains, Maryland
 White Plains, Nevada
 White Plains, New York
 White Plains, North Carolina

Military 
 Battle of White Plains, near White Plains, New York during the American Revolutionary War
 USS White Plains (AFS-4), a Combat Stores Ship in service from 1968 to 1995
 USS White Plains (CVE-66), an Escort Aircraft Carrier in service from 1943 to 1946, and notable for action in the Battle off Samar

Other uses 
 White Plains (band), a British pop-rock band
 White Plains (Springville, South Carolina), a historic house
 White Plains (Cookeville, Tennessee), an antebellum plantation house